The Gerald Lampert Memorial Award is an annual literary award presented by the League of Canadian Poets to the best volume of poetry published by a first-time poet.  It is presented in honour of poetry promoter Gerald Lampert. Each winner receives an honorarium of $1000.

Winners and nominees

References

External links
League of Canadian Poets

Canadian poetry awards
First book awards
Awards established in 1981
1981 establishments in Canada
English-language literary awards